This is a list of all football players that have played for national team of North Macedonia.

Ordered by position and followed by number of appearances and goals.

List
Most recent call ups are in BOLD.

Updated 15 March 2023.

Goalkeepers

Petar Miloševski (59/0)
Stole Dimitrievski (58/0)
Tome Pachovski (46/0)
Jane Nikolovski (27/0)
Dančo Celeski (22/0)
Martin Bogatinov (18/0)
Edin Nuredinoski (14/0)
Antonio Filevski (10/0)
Gogo Jovčev (9/0)
Goce Grujovski (8/0)
Damjan Shishkovski (8/0)
Kristijan Naumovski (7/0)
Kire Trajčev (7/0)
Saša Ilić (5/0)
Oka Nikolov (5/0)
Muarem Zekir (4/0)
Filip Madžovski (3/0)
Zoran Micevski (3/0)
Andreja Efremov (2/0)
Igor Aleksovski (1/0)
Dejan Iliev (1/0)
Ljupčo Kmetovski (1/0)
David Mitov Nilsson (1/0)
Darko Tofiloski (1/0)
Kostadin Zahov (1/0)

Defenders

Goce Sedloski (100/8)
Stefan Ristovski (78/2)
Igor Mitreski (70/1)
Nikolče Noveski (64/5)
Ezgjan Alioski (63/12)
Kire Ristevski (57/0)
Vanche Shikov (56/4)
Visar Musliu (49/1)
Goran Popov (46/2)
Darko Velkovski (45/3)
Igor Nikolovski (43/2)
Vlade Lazarevski (43/0)
Goran Stavrevski (40/3)
Daniel Mojsov (39/0)
Aleksandar Vasoski (34/2)
Boban Grncharov (34/1)
Robert Petrov (31/0)
Ljupčo Markovski (30/1)
Zoran Jovanovski (29/0)
Mitko Stojkovski (27/5)
Milan Stojanoski (26/1)
Egzon Bejtulai (26/0)
Boban Babunski (23/1) + YUG (2/0)
Gjoko Zajkov (22/1)
Daniel Georgievski (22/0)
Dragan Veselinovski (20/0)
Stefan Ashkovski (18/0)
Robert Popov (18/0)
Igor Gjuzelov (17/1)
Vasko Božinovski (17/0)
Aleksandar Todorovski (16/0)
Leonard Zuta (15/0)
Aleksandar Lazevski (14/0)
Ilija Najdoski (10/0) + YUG (11/1)
Marjan Gerasimovski (9/0)
Dimitar Kapinkovski (9/0)
Panče Ḱumbev (9/0)
Ljubodrag Milošević (9/0)
Kristijan Toshevski (9/0)
Miroslav Vajs (9/0)
Vladica Brdarovski (8/0)
Risto Milosavov (8/0)
Sašo Zdravevski (8/0)
Kire Grozdanov (7/0)
Zekirija Ramadan (7/0)
Vujadin Stanojković (7/0) + YUG (21/1)
Aguinaldo Braga (6/0)
Ardian Cuculi (6/0)
Dejan Dimitrovski (6/0)
Todor Todoroski (6/0)
Čedomir Janevski (5/1) + YUG (2/0)
Nikola Serafimov (5/0)
Sasho Karadjov (4/1)
Husein Beganović (4/0)
Aleksandar Damčevski (4/0)
Vladimir Dimitrovski (4/0)
Daniel Ivanovski (4/0)
Sašo Janev (4/0)
Igor Nikolaevski (4/0)
Goran Siljanovski (4/0)
Svetozar Stankovski (4/0)
Nikola Tanushev (4/0)
Borche Jovanovski (3/1)
Mite Cikarski (3/0)
Bojan Dimoski (3/0)
Nikola Karčev (3/0)
Igor Kralevski (3/0)
Blagoja Ljamchevski (3/0)
Igor Stojanov (3/0)
Yani Urdinov (3/0)
Xhelil Abdulla (2/0)
Shkumbin Arsllani (2/0)
Besir Demiri (2/0)
Ilir Elmazovski (2/0)
Goran Georgievski (2/0)
Darko Glišić (2/0)
Goran Hristovski (2/0)
Goran Jovanovski (2/0)
Tome Kitanovski (2/0)
Darko Krsteski (2/0)
Mario Mladenovski (2/0)
Marjan Nikolov (2/0)
Dragan Siljanovski (2/0)
Goran Stanić (2/0)
Sedat Berisha (1/0)
Esad Čolaković (1/0)
Bojan Ilievski (1/0)
Toni Jakimovski (1/0)
Vancho Kostov (1/0)
Bojan Markovski (1/0)
Agron Memedi (1/0)
Zija Merxhani (1/0)
Blagoja Milevski (1/0)
Vlatko Novakov (1/0)
Panche Ristevski (1/0)
Perica Stančeski (1/0)
Metodija Stepanovski (1/0)
Jordancho Stojmenovski (1/0)
Zlatko Tanevski (1/0)
Vlado Trifunov (1/0)

Midfielders

Veliče Šumulikoski (84/1)
Artim Šakiri (72/15)
Stefan Spirovski (55/1)
Enis Bardhi (52/13)
Vlatko Grozdanoski (50/4)
Boban Nikolov (48/4)
Elif Elmas (46/9)
Darko Tasevski (45/1)
Toni Micevski (44/4)
Ferhan Hasani (43/2)
Agim Ibraimi (40/7)
Vančo Trajanov (36/3)
Žarko Serafimovski (34/3)
Aleksandar Mitreski (34/0)
Nedžmedin Memedi (32/2)
Arijan Ademi (28/4)
Igor Jančevski (28/0)
Dževdet Šainovski (26/2)
Muhamed Demiri (25/0)
Nikola Gligorov (25/0)
Goran Lazarevski (25/0)
Srgjan Zaharievski (22/3)
Mile Krstev (22/2)
Vlatko Gošev (22/0)
Slavčo Georgievski (21/0)
Tihomir Kostadinov (19/0)
Goce Toleski (18/1)
Filip Despotovski (18/0)
Ostoja Stjepanović (18/0)
Darko Churlinov (17/3)
Marjan Radeski (17/1)
Viktor Trenevski (17/0)
Artim Položani (14/0)
Armend Alimi (13/0)
David Babunski (13/0)
Panče Stojanov (13/0)
Mario Gjurovski (12/2)
Besart Abdurahimi (12/1)
Sašo Lazarevski (11/0)
Stojan Ignatov (11/0)
Sašo Miloševski (10/1)
Dragi Kanatlarovski (9/2) + YUG (1/0)
Milovan Petrovikj (9/0)
Rade Karanfilovski (8/1)
Daniel Avramovski (8/0)
Toni Savevski (8/0) + YUG (2/0)
Boško Gjurovski (7/3) + YUG (4/0)
Blaže Georgioski (7/0)
Muarem Muarem (7/0)
Nebi Mustafi (7/0)
Vančo Trajčev (7/0)
Marjan Stojkovski (6/1)
Toni Naumovski (6/0)
Dushko Trajchevski (6/0)
Kire Markoski (5/1)
Ilcho Borov (5/0)
Blaže Georgioski (5/0)
Nikola Gjorgjev (5/0)
Dančo Masev (5/0)
Dejan Blazhevski (4/1)
Jani Atanasov (4/0)
Toni Banduliev (4/0)
Gorancho Georgiev (4/0)
Ilami Halimi (4/0)
Bojan Najdenov (4/0)
Blagoja Todorovski (4/0)
Jovica Trajčev (4/0)
Vulnet Emini (3/0)
Valon Ethemi (3/0)
Dragan Gjorgiev (3/0)
Goce Markovski (3/0)
Toni Meglenski (3/0)
Ivan Nastevski (3/0)
Predrag Ranđelović (3/0)
Zoran Vasevski (3/0)
Nikolche Zdravevski (3/0)
Almir Bajramovski (2/0)
Naum Batkoski (2/0)
Besmir Bojku (2/0)
Blagoja Dimitrov (2/0)
Agon Elezi (2/0)
Nijaz Lena (2/0)
Riste Markoski (2/0)
Darko Micevski (2/0)
Dejan Peshevski (2/0)
Erdal Rakip (2/0)
Tauljant Sulejmanov (2/0)
Zlatko Todorovski (2/0)
Borislav Tomovski (2/0)
Erol Topchiu (2/0)
Ennur Totre (2/0)
Ali Adem (1/0)
Muharem Bajrami (1/0)
Bobi Bozhinovski (1/0)
Ertan Demiri (1/0)
Enis Fazlagikj (1/0)
Gilson (1/0)
Tomche Grozdanovski (1/0)
Gligor Gligorov (1/0)
Muhamed Huseini (1/0)
Dejan Milošeski (1/0)
Martin Mirchevski (1/0)
Ivan Mitrov (1/0)
Nderim Nexhipi (1/0)
Ivan Nikolov (1/0)
Bunjamin Shabani (1/0)
Gjorgi Stoilov (1/0)
Denis Trajkovski (1/0)

Forwards

Goran Pandev (122/38)
Aleksandar Trajkovski (81/20)
Ivan Trichkovski (67/7)
Gjorgji Hristov (48/16)
Ilija Nestorovski (48/10)
Ilčo Naumoski (46/9)
Goran Maznov (45/10)
Aco Stojkov (43/5)
Mirko Ivanovski (27/1)
Saša Ćirić (26/8)
Adis Jahović (19/3)
Argjend Beqiri (17/1)
Stevica Ristić (17/1)
Zoran Boškovski (16/5)
Besart Ibraimi (16/0)
Milan Ristovski (15/3)
Krste Velkoski (15/0)
Dragan Dimitrovski (14/2)
Blazhe Ilijoski (14/1)
Dragan Načevski (14/1)
Jovan Kostovski (13/2)
Bojan Miovski (13/1)
Vlatko Stojanovski (10/2)
Vančo Micevski (9/4)
Dušan Savić (9/0)
Miroslav Gjokić (8/2)
Filip Ivanovski (8/1)
Dragan Čadikovski (8/0)
Ljupcho Doriev (7/0)
Samir Fazli (7/0)
Zoran Miserdovski (7/0)
Darko Pančev (6/1) + YUG (27/17)
Sašo Krstev (6/0)
Risto Božinov (5/2)
Arbën Nuhiji (5/2)
Jurica Siljanoski (5/1)
Dorian Babunski (5/0)
Aleksandar Bajevski (5/0)
Ardijan Nuhiji (5/0)
Dejvi Glavevski (4/3)
Zoran Baldovaliev (4/1)
Bajram Fetai (4/0)
Goran Petreski (4/0)
Goran Stankovski (4/0)
Milko Gjurovski (3/0) + YUG (6/2)
Ivica Gligorovski (3/0)
Ismail Ismaili (3/0)
Borče Manevski (3/0)
Dejan Ristovski (3/0)
Marko Simonovski (3/0)
Muzafer Ejupi (2/0)
Hristijan Kirovski (2/0)
Mensur Kurtiši (2/0)
Riste Naumov (2/0)
Angelko Panov (2/0)
Viktor Angelov (1/0)
Metodi Maksimov (1/0)
Kristijan Trapanovski (1/0)
Zoran Zlatkovski (1/0)

References
 List of all-time players at Football Federation of Macedonia official website
 North Macedonia at EU-Football.info
 North Macedonia at National-Football-Teams.com

 
Association football player non-biographical articles